Neuenkirchen-Vörden (until 1993 Neuenkirchen (Oldenburg)) is a municipality in the district of Vechta, in Lower Saxony, Germany. It is situated approximately 30 km southwest of Vechta, and 30 km north of Osnabrück.

References

Vechta (district)